This is the list of presidents of Trentino-Alto Adige/Südtirol since 1948.

See also
Politics of Trentino-Alto Adige/Südtirol

Politics of Trentino-Alto Adige/Südtirol
Trentino